Sekolah Menengah Kebangsaan Tengku Ampuan Rahimah, Klang, better known as STAR, is a secondary school in Klang, Selangor in Malaysia. It is named after the former Royal Consort of Selangor, Tengku Ampuan Rahimah.

It neighbours three other schools; SMJK (C) Hin Hua (Persendirian), La Salle School and SK Simpang Lima.

See also
 Klang
 Persiaran Raja Muda Musa
 La Salle School, Klang
 SK Simpang Lima

Schools in Selangor